Great Falls International Airport  is a public/military airport in city limits three miles southwest of central Great Falls in Cascade County, Montana, United States. The airport has also been called Great Falls Municipal Airport.

The National Plan of Integrated Airport Systems for 2011–2015 categorized it as a primary commercial service airport. Federal Aviation Administration records say the airport had 143,811 passenger boardings (enplanements) in calendar year 2008, 146,438 in 2009 and 155,204 in 2010.

Great Falls International Airport is home to Great Falls Air National Guard Base, which hosts the Montana Air National Guard's 120th Airlift Wing (120 AW), the "Vigilantes." Operationally-gained by Air Mobility Command (AMC), the 120 AW reequipped with the Lockheed C-130 Hercules in 2014, which it employs in medium airlift missions. In its previous incarnation as the 120th Fighter Wing, it previously flew the McDonnell Douglas F-15 Eagle.

With the transfer of its KC-135 aircraft in the 1990s, Malmstrom's  runway is closed to fixed-wing traffic and open only to military helicopters, so Great Falls ANGB provides support for fixed-wing military aircraft visiting Malmstrom AFB.

History
Great Falls International Airport was initiated in November 1928. The airport was leased by the U.S. War Department during World War II and became a home for the 7th Ferrying Group (Air Transport Command) of the U.S. Army Air Forces during the war. Located on Gore Hill, the airport was known as Gore Field during its military use. During the war years, more than 7,500 bombers and fighter aircraft passed through Great Falls on their way to Europe and the Pacific. The U.S. Army acquired an additional  and built many buildings and other facilities. The airport was under government control until June 1948 when the Department of Defense deeded it back to the City of Great Falls with the stipulation that the facility could revert to military control in a national emergency. The airport was released from this clause in 1961.

In 1975 the terminal was replaced and all runways, aprons, and taxiways updated. With Federal Aviation Administration matching funds, the Great Falls International Airport Authority performs annual operations, maintenance, and capital improvements.

The award-winning terminal was designed by Davidson-Kuhr Architects of Great Falls, Montana, with the lead architect being David S. Davidson.

Great Falls has had airline flights since the 1930s. For at least part of each year from 1977 to 1981 it saw scheduled Northwest DC-10s EWR-DTW-ORD-BIL-GTF-GEG-SEA and back.

In 2011 the airport recorded the most boardings (172,415) in its history. GTF was the fifth-busiest of the state's 15 major airports in 2011, behind Billings (407,960 enplanements), Bozeman (397,822), Missoula (292,530), and Kalispell (179,034).

In early 2012, Frontier Airlines announced new flights to Great Falls from the Denver hub. The Airport Authority hoped to address rising ticket prices and a seasonal shortage of seats with low-cost Frontier flights, but Frontier announced it was pulling out of Great Falls during its Denver hub restructuring in December 2014.

AvMax, a Calgary-based large jet maintenance and repair business, opened a large operation at GTF in 2006; they employ 150.

Model airplane collection
The terminal contains what is believed to be the world's largest collection of model airplanes. 883 such airplanes are on display, about 2/3 of the entire collection. The models were built and painted by local Great Falls resident Bary Poletto from 1977 through 2003. He died in January 2013.

Facilities
The airport covers 2,113 acres (855 ha) at an elevation of 3,680 feet (1,122 m). It has three asphalt runways: 3/21 is 10,502 by 150 feet (3,201 x 46 m); 16/34 is 5,722 by 150 feet (1,744 x 46 m); 7/25 is 4,294 by 75 feet (1,309 x 23 m).

In the year ending March 31, 2011 the airport had 41,591 aircraft operations, average 113 per day: 52% general aviation, 25% air taxi, 12% airline, and 11% military. 108 aircraft were then based at this airport: 61% single-engine, 17% military, 11.1% multi-engine, 8% helicopter, and 3% jet.

Airlines and destinations

Passenger

Cargo

Statistics

Top destinations

See also
 Montana World War II Army Airfields
 Air Transport Command
 List of airports in Montana

References

External links
 Great Falls International Airport, official site
 Montana Air National Guard
 Aerial image as of July 1995 from USGS The National Map
 
 

Airports in Montana
Transportation in Cascade County, Montana
Buildings and structures in Great Falls, Montana